Babalad or Muttyna Babalad is a village in the southern state of Karnataka, India. It is located in Bijapur  taluk of Bijapur district, Karnataka. It is nearly 25 km from the district headquarters, Bijapur . It's one of several small villages near Bijapur.

Demographics 
, Babalad had a population of 1,500 with 800 males and 700 females.

Shree Guru Chakravarti Babaladi Sadashiv Murthy Mutt 

It is one of the Hindu pilgrimage sites in the northern district of Karnataka. It is one of the Babaladi mutt. The village Babaladi is situated on the banks of the Krishna River and is also submerged in backwater of the Alamatti Reservoir (Lal Bhahadur Shastri Sagar).

Agriculture 

More than 80% of the village's land is well-irrigated. Main crops grown: sugar cane and maize. Other sources of irrigation include the Krishna river, water canals and bore wells.

Religion

Village is having mainly Hindu and Muslim community people.

Language

People speak mainly Kannada.

Temples

The village has several temples, Such as
 Shree Guru Chakravarti Babaladi Sadashiv Murthy Mutt
 Shree Rameshwar Temple
 Shree Basaveshwar Temple
 Shree Hanuman Temple
 Shree Mahalakshmi Temple
 Shree Durga Devi Temple
 Shree Dhyamavva Devi Temple
 Shree Yallamma Devi Temple

Mosques

Mosque and Maszid for Muslim community. Moharam and Uras festivals are celebrated by both Hindu and Muslim religion.

Trusts

Some associations are put on cultural and sports events and other activities:

Transportation 

Babaladi is connected to Bijapur through Babaleshwar.

State Highway

State Highway - 55 is passes near by village.

State Highway - 55 => Babaleshwar - Kambagi - Galagali- Mudhol - Yadawad - Yaragatti

Education 

In the village there is a Govt. Higher Primary School (HPS, Babaladi), currently working from 1st to 8th standard years, having more than 150 students enrolled. The village has an approximate literacy rate of 70%.

Literacy Rate

The village literacy rate is about 75%. Males has 75% and Female has 70% of literacy.

Politics

Babaladi village is comes under Babaleshwar Assembly Constituency and Vijayapur Parliamentary Constituency.

Telephone Code

 Babaleshwar - 08355

PIN Code

 Sarawad - 586125

Post office is in Gunadal and main post office is in Sarawad.

Festivals 

The villagers mainly celebrate Babaladi Jatre on behalf of Shree Guru Chaktravarti Babaladi Sadashiv Mutrhy and Shri Hari Pandurang Vittal Saptaha(Dindhi), and also Kara Hunnume, Nagara Panchami, Deepavli, Ugadi and Dassara every year.

References

External links
 http://Bijapur.nic.in/

Villages in Bijapur district, Karnataka